Woodlands Bus Depot is an SMRT Buses bus depot located in Woodlands, Singapore.

References

External links
 Interchange/Terminal (SMRT Buses)

Bus garages
Bus stations in Singapore
1999 establishments in Singapore
Woodlands, Singapore